Justin (Jiapeng) Han (born 9 August 1991) is an Australian table tennis player.

Personal
Han was born in Harbin, Heilongjiang, China, he graduated from Jihong Primary School and immigrated to Australia to study (Asquith Boys High School in New South Wales) in 2008

After graduating from Asquith Boys High School, Han studied at the New South Wales Institute of Sport in Sydney, Australia.

Career

Before arriving in Australia, Han was a member of the Chinese National Table Tennis Development squad. Han qualified with the Australian Olympic team in 2009 and competed for Australia at the 2012 Summer Olympics.

References

1991 births
Living people
Table tennis players at the 2012 Summer Olympics
Olympic table tennis players of Australia
Australian people of Chinese descent
Table tennis players from Harbin
Chinese male table tennis players
Australian male table tennis players
Naturalised table tennis players